Mottsville is an unincorporated community within the Humboldt–Toiyabe National Forest on the western edge of the Carson Valley in northwestern Douglas County, Nevada, United States.

History
Settlement on the Emigrant Trail where Hiram Mott and son Israel settled in 1851

See also

References

External links

Unincorporated communities in Douglas County, Nevada
Unincorporated communities in Nevada